Abraham Zinzindohoue (born 1948 in Bohicon) is Beninese lawyer and politician. He was the Minister of Justice of Benin from April 2006 to 2007.

He was President of the Supreme Court of Benin and Senior Vice-President of the Supreme Council of the Judiciary in 2005.

References

Beninese lawyers
People from Bohicon
1948 births
Living people
Justice ministers of Benin